Gaius Ateius Capito may refer to:
Gaius Ateius Capito (tribune), tribune of the people in 55 BCE
Gaius Ateius Capito (jurist), senator and jurist under Augustus and Tiberius